This article lists feature-length British films and full-length documentaries that have their premiere in 2023 and were at least partly produced by the United Kingdom. It does not feature short films, medium-length films, made-for-TV films, pornographic films, filmed theater, VR films or interactive films, nor does it include films screened in previous years that have official release dates in 2023.

Film premieres

January–March

April–June

July–September

October–December

TBA

See also 
Lists of British films
2023 in film
2023 in British music
2023 in British radio
2023 in British television
2023 in the United Kingdom
List of British films of 2022

References

External links
 

Lists of 2023 films by country or language
2023